is a Japanese anime television series by Wit Studio. It was broadcast for 12 episodes on Fuji TV's Noitamina programming block from April to June 2016. The series was streamed on Amazon Prime Instant Video service. Two compilation films premiered in Japanese theaters in December 2016 and January 2017. Crunchyroll and Funimation co-released the anime on Blu-ray and DVD in the United States; Crunchyroll also acquired the merchandise rights.

An anime theatrical film that is set six months after the anime series, titled Kabaneri of the Iron Fortress: The Battle of Unato premiered in May 2019. A Netflix version was released as a three-part series in 2019.

Plot
A mysterious virus appears during the Industrial Revolution that transforms infected humans into  and rapidly spreads. Kabane are aggressive, undead creatures that cannot be defeated unless the glowing golden heart, which is protected by a layer of iron, is pierced, or an important body part is completely severed (such as the head).

On the island country , people have built fortress-like "stations" to shelter themselves from these creatures. One day, a hayajirō hijacked by the kabane crashes into Aragane Station and they overrun the city.

Characters

 
A young man who makes a living as a steamsmith at Aragane Station. He and his good friend Takumi developed a bolt gun-like weapon called a piercing gun in order to defeat the Kabane. He is very intelligent and a great craftman, even going as far as to invent and create a piercing gun with enough strength to break the metal cage around a Kabane's heart. When Aragane Station is invaded by Kabane, Ikoma is able to successfully test his piercing gun, killing a Kabane with the bullet destroying the metal cage protecting its heart, but is unfortunately bitten in the process. He is able to prevent the virus from reaching his brain by blocking his carotid arteries, transforming him into a human/Kabane hybrid, a Kabaneri. After becoming a Kabaneri, his fighting prowess increases. He gains incredible strength and endurance, even shrugging off gunfire and being bitten by Kabane multiple times. Ikoma and Mumei are often fighting alongside each other against many Kabane and work exceedingly well as a duo. Ikoma makes a promise to Mumei to someday turn her back into a human as he failed to do so in his childhood for his sister. Ikoma is the lead protagonist of the Kabaneri series.

A mysterious and anonymous girl who boards the hayajiro Kotetsujo and appears at Aragane Station. She is revealed to be a Kabaneri as well as a very strong and agile fighter, capable of killing dozens of Kabane with ease. She became a Kabaneri through a surgical operation as the result of her brainwashing by Biba, making her believe unless she became stronger, she would also end up like her mother. Constant fighting can leave her sleepy and like Ikoma, she requires blood to stop herself from attacking other people. She and Ikoma often fight Kabane together and make a great duo. She treasures Ikoma's promise to one day turn her back into a human. Over the course of the series, Mumei develops feelings for Ikoma. Mumei is the lead heroine of the Kabaneri series.

The eldest daughter of the Yomogawa family, which governs Aragane Station. After her father is infected, she becomes the leader of the Aragane survivors. Despite her noble status, she's reasonable and understanding, even offering her blood to the Kabaneri. She is also an expert Archer using a steam powered bow. Ayame seems to have feelings for Kurusu, her bodyguard and friend who is around her age. She occasionally practices Kendo with him, and Kurusu frequently blushes around her.
 

A young Bushi who serves the Yomogawa family as Ayame's personal bodyguard. Among Bushi his skill with a sword is considerable. He is usually somber and honest, and he maintains his honor as a Bushi. Despite initially resenting Ikoma, he eventually recognizes the Kabaneri's usefulness and also starts to respect him. He is later given a reinforced katana that can pierce a Kabane's heart with ease. Kurusu seems to have feelings for Lady Ayame, as he frequently blushes around her.

Ikoma's best friend and fellow steam smith, who helped him develop his piercing gun. Towards the end of the series, he is killed by Biba while protecting Ikoma.

Ikoma and Takumi's friend and fellow steam smith. A friendly and warm-hearted girl takes care of the children that lost their families to the Kabane.

A crew member of the Kotetsujo. A stoic and taciturn girl who, despite being only an apprentice, becomes the Kotetsujo'''s engineer and driver out of necessity. She might have feelings for Sukari, which are implied in The Battle of Unato film.

A steam smith who lives at Aragane Station. Despite his aloof personality, he's a good mechanic and a decent fighter. He might have feelings for Yukina, which are implied in The Battle of Unato film.
 

A Bushi who serves the Yomogawa family. Unlike other Bushis, he's reasonable and even friendly to the Kabaneri. He and his fellow Bushi are later given reinforced bullets that can penetrate the Kabane more easily. He is also good friends with Kurusu.

The train's chief mechanic who has hair like a 17th-century wig and speaks with English phrases. Also serves as the narrator for the series' episode previews.
 

Charismatic, ruthless and manipulative, he inducted Mumei in his philosophy of strength superiority, where the weak don't deserve to live and should not even have the will to. He greatly resents his father for abandoning him and the 400,000 men he sent to fight on the front lines by essentially starving them of supplies. This made him develop his philosophy, making his purpose from that point to kill his father and show him how weak his fear made him. To do that he intends to destroy the Kongokaku (the shōguns stronghold) using artificially created Kabaneri, and the blue blood he developed, making artificial hybrid colonies when injected with huge destructive power.
 

A Kabaneri member of the Hunters. She only stops at the sight of Biba at which point he callously murders her.
 

The Captain of the Hunters, who serves under Biba Amatori.

The erstwhile Lord of Unato Station. Five years before the Battle of Unato, he shared a close and loving relationship with his daughter, Miyuki. However, when the Station is attacked by the Kabane, he is infected with the virus. However, he becomes a Kabaneri instead of a full-fledged Kabane. He is surrounded by soldiers threatening to shoot him; he asks his friend, Unmo, whether he is a man or a Kabane. Miyuki tries to stop the soldiers from shooting her father, only to be mistakenly killed. A devastated and enraged Kageyuki goes on a rampage and brutally murders the soldiers in the room. Unmo escapes, but Kageyuki bites his daughter's corpse, wanting her to come back by any means necessary, turning her into a Nue. The Nue forms a nest around the Unato Castle, keeping Unato trapped in a perennial battle against the Kabane.

Media
AnimeKabaneri of the Iron Fortress was directed by Tetsurō Araki and written by Ichirō Ōkouchi, with music by Hiroyuki Sawano and original character designs by Haruhiko Mikimoto. The series was broadcast on Fuji TV's Noitamina block from April 8 to June 30, 2016, with a total of 12 episodes. A prologue for the anime premiered for a week in theaters across Japan starting March 18, 2016. Amazon streamed the series on their Amazon Prime Instant Video service. Two compilation films premiered in Japanese theaters on December 31, 2016, and January 7, 2017. Crunchyroll and Funimation co-released the anime on Blu-ray and DVD in the United States; Crunchyroll also acquired the merchandise rights.

An anime theatrical film that is set six months after the anime series, titled , premiered on May 10, 2019. A Netflix version was released as a three-part series in 2019.

Films

Three feature length anime theatrical films were released between 2016 and 2019. The first two films, which are recaps of the first and second halves of the TV series, premiered in Japanese theaters on December 31, 2016, and January 7, 2017. The third film, titled Kabaneri of the Iron Fortress: The Battle of Unato, takes place six months after the events of the TV series and revolves around the Battle of Unato. It premiered on May 10, 2019. The Battle of Unato was streamed internationally on September 13, 2019 as a Netflix original consisting of three episodes.

Other
A manga adaptation, illustrated by Shirō Yoshida, was serialized in Mag Garden's Monthly Comic Garden magazine from May 2, 2016 to November 5, 2018. Mag Garden released four tankōbon'' volumes from December 10, 2016 and December 10, 2018.

A mobile game developed by TriFort, Inc. and published by DMM Games titled  was released on December 19, 2018 for Android and iOS, featuring an animated opening sequence by Wit Studio.

Music

The soundtrack was composed by Hiroyuki Sawano and was released by Aniplex on May 18, 2016. The opening theme is "Kabaneri of the Iron Fortress" by Egoist and the ending theme is "ninelie" by Aimer with chelly. For episode 11, the ending theme is "Through My Blood <AM>" by Aimer.

Track listing
All music composed by Hiroyuki Sawano.

Reception
The series won the 2016 Newtype Anime Awards for Best TV Anime, Best Soundtrack, Best Character Design, Best Screenplay and Best Studio.

Notes

References

External links
 

2016 anime television series debuts
Anime composed by Hiroyuki Sawano
Anime films composed by Hiroyuki Sawano
Anime with original screenplays
Aniplex
Crunchyroll anime
Animated television series by Amazon Studios
Dark fantasy anime and manga
Fiction about diseases and disorders
Films with screenplays by Ichirō Ōkouchi
Funimation
IG Port franchises
Noitamina
Mag Garden manga
Military anime and manga
Post-apocalyptic anime and manga
Shōnen manga
Steampunk anime and manga
Television shows set in Asia
Television shows set in Japan
Television shows written by Ichirō Ōkouchi
Video games scored by Hiroyuki Sawano
Wit Studio
Zombies in anime and manga
Alternate history anime and manga